Kurukshetram is a 2006 Tamil language film directed by director Jayabharathi, starring Sathyaraj, Roja, Vadivelu, and  K. M. Rajendra. The music for this film was scored by Isaac Thomas Kottukapally. The film is produced by K. M. Rajendra under the banner Rajendra Movies. The cinematography and editing for this film were done by A. Karuppaya and Suresh Urs respectively. Kurukshetram is Sathyaraj's 170th film. The film released on 11 August 2006.

Plot
Bharath (Sathyaraj) and his wife Vaishnavi (Roja) live in Western America with their children Subash and Sindu. Riots break out in the part of America where Bharath and his family live, during which their daughter Sindu dies in a bomb blast. After Sindu's death, Vaishnavi falls ill, so Bharath decides to shift to Chennai along with his family. Even after going to Chennai, Bharath and his family are not living happily because Bharath's friend Jack (K. M. Rajendra) is torturing Bharath's family by blackmailing Vaishnavi. The flashback in the movie reveals why Jack threatens Vaishnavi.

Cast

 Sathyaraj as Bharath
 Roja as Vaishnavi
 Vadivelu as Nondippuli
 K. M. Rajendra as Jack
 Nizhalgal Ravi as Kailash
 Thalaivasal Vijay as Westerner
 Bharathi Mani as Tambu
 Master Sachin as Subash, Bharath's son
 Hemalatha as Sindhu, Bharath's daughter
 Vennira Aadai Moorthy as a booth and restaurant owner
S. N. Parvathy as Nondippuli's mother
 Singamuthu as Share autorickshaw driver
 Thambi Ramaiah as Head constable
 Vijay Ganesh as Police constable
 Vengal Rao as Man in a temple
 Bava Lakshmanan as Moneylender
 Halwa Vasu as Hotel waiter
 Citizen Mani as Restaurant customer
 Amirthalingam as Pandi, restaurant customer
 Bonda Mani as the owner of "Hotel Doobakoor" restaurant
 Telephone Raj as the owner of "Hotel Doobakoor" restaurant
 Ramya in a special appearance

Legacy 
The comedy sequences in which Vadivelu instructs how to make an uttapam became viral upon release.

References 

2006 films
2000s Tamil-language films